All Saints is a church of England church in Croydon, London, England. It is a Grade I listed building.

History
It was built in 1230, with the tower being added in 1330; the north aisle and vestries in 1937; and a northern extension in 1981.

Present day
The church falls within Croydon Central Deanery in the Diocese of Southwark.

All Saints is a parish in the Anglo-Catholic tradition.

References 

Grade I listed churches in London
Sanderstead
Croydon
Churches completed in 1230
1230 establishments in England
Croydon